Beinn an Eoin (619 m) is a mountain in the Northwest Highlands of Scotland. It lies in the remote Coigach area in the far northwest of Scotland, north of Ullapool.

One of the magnificent Coigach peaks, Beinn an Eoin has long crags on its western side and a notable subsidiary peak, Sgurr Tuath, to its north. The nearest settlement is Strathkanaird.

References

Mountains and hills of the Northwest Highlands
Marilyns of Scotland
Grahams